A Good Wife  is a 2016 Serbian drama film written, directed by and starring Mirjana Karanović. It was shown in the World Cinema Dramatic Competition section at the 2016 Sundance Film Festival. It was named as one of five films that could be chosen as the Serbian submission for the Best Foreign Language Film at the 89th Academy Awards, but it was not selected.

Cast
 Mirjana Karanović as Milena
 Boris Isaković as Vlada
 Jasna Đuričić as Suzana
 Bojan Navojec as Dejan
 Hristina Popović as Nataša
 Vlado Kerošević as Sveta
 Ksenija Marinković as Zlata
 Isidora Simijonović as Katarina
 Marko Nikolić as Mirosljub

References

External links
 

2016 films
2016 drama films
Serbian drama films
2010s Serbian-language films
2016 directorial debut films
Films shot in Serbia
Films set in Serbia